The 1926 Oregon gubernatorial election took place on November 2, 1926 to elect the governor of the U.S. state of Oregon. The election matched incumbent Democrat Walter M. Pierce against Republican Isaac L. Patterson and Independent candidate H. H. Stallard, who ran on an anti-Prohibition platform. Patterson won by a wide margin.

Background
During a period of time in which Republicans had dominated politics in Oregon, Democrat Pierce had won election in 1922 with the support of the Ku Klux Klan, which was for a short time a powerful political force in Oregon. However, soon after the 1922 election, the Klan faded in power due in part to internal struggles and changing public sentiment.

Campaign
Now running for re-election in 1926, Pierce won his party's primary for re-election in 1926 over Louise Palmer Weber, one of many anti-Prohibition candidates that year who ran on a platform of repealing or modifying laws regarding the regulation of alcoholic beverages in Oregon.

In their primary, Republicans nominated former state senator I. L. Patterson, who had chaired Calvin Coolidge's successful election campaign in Oregon, over Jay H. Upton and W. A. Carter. An independent candidate, H. H. Stallard, also entered the campaign as an Independent with a focus on repealing prohibition in the state.

In the general election, Patterson cruised to a 12-point victory over the incumbent Pierce, with Stallard earning more than 5% of the vote.

Election results

Aftermath
Patterson served about three years of his term before dying of pneumonia on December 22, 1929. Pierce was later elected to the United States House of Representatives, and represented Oregon's 2nd congressional district from 1933 to 1942.

References

Gubernatorial
1926
Oregon
November 1926 events